Accommodation of Crews Convention, 1946 is  an International Labour Organization Convention.

It was established in 1946, with the preamble stating:
Having decided upon the adoption of certain proposals with regard to crew accommodation on board ship,...

Modification 
The convention has not been brought into force. Its principles were subsequently revised in 1949 by Convention C92, Accommodation of Crews Convention (Revised), 1949.

External links 
Text.
Ratifications and denunciations.

International Labour Organization conventions
Treaties concluded in 1946
Treaties not entered into force
Admiralty law treaties
1946 in labor relations